Bluff Island may refer to the following islands:

Bluff Island (Andaman and Nicobar Islands)
Bluff Island (Antarctica), Prydz Bay, Antarctica
Bluff Island (Hong Kong), Port Shelter, Sai Kung District, Hong Kong